Kunyu is a county-level city in Xinjiang Uyghur Autonomous Region, China. It is geographically located in Hotan Prefecture of Southern Xinjiang, but is directly administered by the Xinjiang regional government.

The city was formerly the settled and cultivated areas of the 224th Regiment of the 14th Division of the Xinjiang Production and Construction Corps (XPCC). In January 2016, the State Council of China approved the establishment of Kunyu City and it was officially established on 26 February 2016.

"Regiment One Pasture", located within Qira County, is part of Kunyu.

"Regiment 225", located within Yutian/Keriya County, is part of Kunyu.

References 

County-level divisions of Xinjiang
2016 establishments in China
Populated places established in 2016
Xinjiang Production and Construction Corps
Populated places in Xinjiang